The Moyes Litesport is an Australian high-wing, single-place, hang glider that was designed by Gerolf Heinrichs and is produced by Moyes Delta Gliders of Kurnell, New South Wales. The aircraft is supplied complete and ready-to-fly.

Design and development
Designed as a sport and competition glider with a kingpost, the Litesport is based upon the highly successful kingpostless Moyes Litespeed line. It is made from 7075 aluminum tubing, with the double-surface wing covered in Dacron sailcloth and incorporates a variable geometry system.

Variants
Litesport 3
Small-sized model for lighter pilots. Its  span wing is cable braced from a single kingpost.
Litesport 4
Medium-sized model for mid-weight pilots. Its  span wing is cable braced from a single kingpost.
Litesport 5
Large sized model for heavier pilots. Its  span wing is cable braced from a single kingpost.

Specifications (Litesport 4)

References

External links

Litesport
Hang gliders